The grapheme Ň (minuscule: ň) is a letter in the Czech, Slovak and Turkmen alphabets. It is formed from Latin N with the addition of a caron (háček in Czech and mäkčeň in Slovak) and follows plain N in the alphabet. Ň and ň are at Unicode codepoints U+0147 and U+0148, respectively.

/ɲ/
In Czech and Slovak, ň represents , the palatal nasal, as in English canyon. Thus, it has the same function as Albanian and Serbo-Croatian nj / њ, French and Italian gn, Catalan and Hungarian ny, Polish ń, Occitan and Portuguese nh, Galician and Spanish ñ and Belarusian, Russian and Ukrainian нь. 

In the 19th century, it was used in Croatian for the same sound.

In Slovak, ne is pronounced ňe. In Czech, this syllable is written ně. In Czech and Slovak, ni is pronounced ňi. In Russian, Ukrainian and similar languages, soft vowels (е, и, ё, ю, я) also change previous н to нь in pronunciation.

/ŋ/
In Turkmen, ň represents the sound , the velar nasal, as in English thing. In Turkmen's Cyrillic script, this corresponds to the letter Ң ң (En with descender). In Janalif, it corresponds to the letter Ꞑ ꞑ (N with descender). In other Turkic languages with the velar nasal, it corresponds to the letter Ñ ñ (N with tilde).

It is also used in Southern Kurdish to represent the same sound.

Computing code

References

See also
Czech orthography
Czech phonology

Latin letters with diacritics